SKM may refer to:
Sadie Kneller Miller, 1900s journalist with gender-hiding byline SKM
Shek Kip Mei station, Hong Kong; MTR station code
Singapore Kindness Movement
Sinclair Knight Merz, Australia
Szybka Kolej Miejska (Tricity), transport service, Poland
Szybka Kolej Miejska (Warsaw), transport service, Poland
SK Telecom, NYSE symbol
Sikkim Krantikari Morcha, political party in Sikkim, India
Stoke Mandeville railway station, Buckinghamshire, England; National Rail station code
She Kills Monsters, 2011 play by Qui Nguyen